José Sebastião Pires Neto (born February 23, 1956, in Sorocaba), also known as Pires, is a former Brazilian footballer who plays as a defensive midfielder. He played for Ulsan Hyundai FC of the South Korean K League, then known as Hyundai Horangi

Honours
 Campeonato Brasileiro Série A in 1972, 1973 with Palmeiras
 Campeonato Paulista in 1972, 1974, 1976 with Palmeiras
 Campeonato Baiano in 1986 with Bahia
 League Cup winners in 1994 with Hyundai Horangi

External links
 
 

1956 births
Brazilian footballers
Brazil international footballers
Brazilian expatriate footballers
Association football midfielders
Living people
Sociedade Esportiva Palmeiras players
CR Vasco da Gama players
America Football Club (RJ) players
Esporte Clube Bahia players
Vitória S.C. players
Gil Vicente F.C. players
C.F. Os Belenenses players
Nacional Atlético Clube (SP) players
São José Esporte Clube players
Ulsan Hyundai FC players
Campeonato Brasileiro Série A players
Primeira Liga players
K League 1 players
Brazilian expatriate sportspeople in South Korea
Expatriate footballers in South Korea
Expatriate footballers in Portugal
People from Sorocaba
Footballers from São Paulo (state)